Mandalorians are fictional people associated with the planet Mandalore in the Star Wars universe and franchise created by George Lucas. Their most distinct cultural features are their battle helmets, chest armor, wrist gauntlets, and often jet packs, similar to those used by Boba Fett and his father/clone host, Jango Fett.

First conceptualized for The Empire Strikes Back as a group of white-armored "supercommandos", the idea developed into a single bounty hunter character, Boba Fett. Although Fett was not identified as a Mandalorian in the film, his popularity inspired an extensive inquisition into Mandalorians in future Star Wars media, including novels, comics, television series, and video games.

The Star Wars Expanded Universe and the television series The Clone Wars, Rebels, and The Mandalorian expanded upon Mandalorian lore with the introduction of additional characters, and established the Mandalorians not as an "alien race or species", but a distinct ideology of humans and various aliens from Mandalore and nearby worlds united by a common creed with a stoic, spartan warrior tradition.

Creation and development
In production for The Empire Strikes Back (1980), Ralph McQuarrie and Joe Johnston designed armor intended to be worn by soldiers described as super-commandos from the Mandalore system, armed with weapons built into white suits and known for battling the Jedi. Initially, the soldiers were called Super Troopers and were intended to look alike. The group eventually developed into a single bounty hunter character, Boba Fett, and the costume was reworked, but it retained elements such as wrist lasers, rocket darts, a jetpack, and a rocket.

In a 1979 issue of Bantha Tracks, the newsletter of the Official Star Wars Fan Club, Boba's armor was described as that of the "Imperial Shocktroopers, warriors from the olden time" who "came from the far side of the galaxy" and are few in number because they "were wiped out by the Jedi Knights during the Clone Wars". The backstory of the Mandalorians was first extensively explored in issues of Marvel Comics' original Star Wars series and various other Star Wars Legends media, including comics by Dark Horse and video games by LucasArts.

Star Wars: Episode II – Attack of the Clones (2002) introduces the bounty hunter Jango Fett, who also wore Mandalorian armor, and was the adoptive father of Boba, a clone of Jango. More spin-off material explored Mandalorian lore, including the violent Death Watch sect. Following the acquisition of Lucasfilm by Disney in 2014, most existing spin-off material was declared to be non-canon. Only the films and spin-off works produced after April 25, 2014, are part of the restructured canon, including television series such as The Clone Wars, Rebels, and The Mandalorian, the latter of which heavily focuses on the Mandalorian creed.

Appearances

Film

Mandalorians made their live action cinematic debut in The Empire Strikes Back (1980), with the bounty hunter Boba Fett, a supporting antagonist. The character previously appeared in the television special Star Wars Holiday Special (1978), and returned in Return of the Jedi (1983) and the prequel film Attack of the Clones (2002), the latter of which established him as a clone, raised by his genetic template, Jango Fett, to be his son. Jango is also a bounty hunter who is not explicitly identified as a Mandalorian in the film, but wears Mandalorian armor, which passes down to Boba Fett. In The Mandalorian, Boba refers to his father as a Mandalorian foundling.

Television series

The Clone Wars
The animated series Star Wars: The Clone Wars expands upon Mandalorian lore with the introduction of new characters, such as Duchess Satine Kryze, the pacifist leader of Mandalore and a romantic interest for Jedi Master Obi-Wan Kenobi, and Pre Vizsla, the leader of the Death Watch faction of Mandalorians who seek to overthrow Satine and restore Mandalore's warrior traditions. Mandalore is depicted as the fictional home planet of the Mandalorian people, located in the Outer Rim in the sector and system of the same name. It has an inhabited moon called Concordia, a mining settlement to which Mandalorian warriors were exiled. Concord Dawn, located in the Mandalore sector, is also the homeworld of several Mandalorian characters, including Jango Fett, and the base of operations for the Protectors.

In The Clone Wars, the planet Mandalore is a largely uninhabitable desert, caused by a war with the Jedi that occurred before the timeframe of the series. The New Mandalorian people built their cities, such as the capital Sundari, in large biodomes. The design of Sundari draws on Cubist elements, and murals located in the city mimic Pablo Picasso's Guernica. The concept of Mandalore as a "large desolate planet of white sand with these cube-like buildings" was developed by Lucas early in development for The Clone Wars season two. Lucas also wanted layers of glass incorporated into the design. Because Sundari did not look enough like a giant city, the production team developed it into a dome with cubes on it. Filoni noted that the desolate and barren appearance was "kind of a Moebius-influenced design". Filoni had the shapes of Boba Fett's armor worked into the windows and the design of the architecture, feeling that the shapes were "emblematic" and that the warrior culture was so strong it was embedded into the architecture.

Rebels
It is established in Star Wars Rebels that Mandalorians had colonized other worlds, such as Concord Dawn and Krownest. The Mandalorians eventually came into contact with the Old Republic and fought their Jedi protectors. Upon seeing the Jedi's force abilities, the Mandalorians created gadgets, weapons and armor to counter Jedi abilities. Despite the animosity between the Mandalorians and the Jedi, Tarre Vizsla became the first Mandalorian Jedi. As a Jedi, Vizsla built the Darksaber and used it to unite his people as their Mand'alor. During Star Wars Rebels, a Mandalorian named Sabine Wren of Clan Wren discovers the Darksaber from Maul's hideout. With the Darksaber, she hoped to unite Mandalore and get her honor back after creating a weapon that would kill Mandalorians. Upon returning to Mandalore, she gained the support of her estranged mother Ursa. Sabine and her mother had differences of opinion as her mother turned to the Empire for support. Ultimately House Wren sides with Sabine. With the Darksaber, she rallies Clan Wren and takes arms against Clan Saxon, which has the backing of the Empire. After Clan Saxon is defeated, the Empire seemingly backs off from Mandalore, and Sabine renounces ownership of the Darksaber to Bo-Katan Kryze, sister of the late Duchess Satine Kryze, who promises to unite all Mandalorian clans under her leadership and restore peace to Mandalore.

The Mandalorian
At some point during the Galactic Civil War, between the events of Rebels (5–1 BBY) and Return of the Jedi (4 ABY), the Empire returned to Mandalore and purged the Mandalorian people, leaving only a few surviving clans and stealing large quantities of the precious Beskar metal, which no blaster or lightsaber can penetrate; this event became known as the "Great Purge" among Mandalorians. The Mandalorian follows the exploits of Din Djarin, also known simply as "The Mandalorian", or "Mando" for short, a bounty hunter not originally from Mandalore. He was orphaned on another planet during the Clone Wars (22–19 BBY) when Separatist battle droids killed his parents; saved by a Mandalorian clan called "The Tribe", Djarin was adopted as a Foundling and raised with their Creed ("The Way of the Mandalore", or simply "The Way"). The Yoda-like toddler that he adopts, Grogu, also known as "The Child", is also considered a foundling, but Djarin decides to return it to the Jedi after discovering it is Force-sensitive.

According to Bo-Katan Kryze in "Chapter 11: The Heiress", Djarin was found by the "Children of the Watch", a group of religious zealots who follow the ancient "Way of the Mandalore", consisting of various forgotten Mandalorian traditions, such as never removing their helmets in front of others; they were excluded from the mainstream of Mandalorian society for trying to spread their beliefs. Djarin thus finds out he's part of an extremist group without ever having known it; he was raised by The Armorer to believe only people who choose to follow the Creed are true Mandalorians. But this confrontation with Kryze's group of Nite Owls revealed that there were also other Mandalorians who were Mandalorian by ancestry, which share some broad cultural ideas and practices with the Watch such as wearing Mandalorian armor, but have no rule against removing one's helmet.

Moff Gideon, leading a faction of ex-Imperials, was personally involved in the Great Purge and obtained the Darksaber (a weapon symbolising dynastic authority on Mandalore) from Bo-Katan after defeating her in combat. During the show's second season, it is revealed that Bo-Katan, along with a small number of Mandalorian warriors willing to follow her, is attempting to reclaim the Darksaber and liberate Mandalore from Imperial occupation. In the season two finale, Djarin defeats Moff Gideon in combat, thus becoming the rightful owner of the Darksaber and the legitimate ruler of Mandalore, which Bo-Katan accepts; even though Djarin is not interested in ruling and would rather pass the Darksaber to her as they intended, she insists she needs to obtain it through combat. The season thus ends with a cliffhanger, as Djarin could either help Bo-Katan and her forces liberate Mandalore in exchange for their assistance in taking down Gideon, or they could become hostile over possession of the Darksaber and ideological differences. Despite his loyalty to the Creed-following Mandalorians who raised him, Djarin seems ever more open to Bo-Katan's Mandalorian views of the Way, as illustrated by his new willingness to remove his helmet on one occasion in front of living organisms.

Legends

In April 2014, Lucasfilm rebranded most of the licensed Star Wars novels, comics, and video games produced since the originating 1977 film Star Wars as Star Wars Legends and declared them non canon to the franchise. Within the Legends continuity, the name "Mandalorian" is associated with a multi-species culture of warrior clans who adhere to the tenets of the Mandalorians. While most of them are humans, there are also Mandalorians of various other species. Mandalore serves as the Mandalorians' home planet. It was originally inhabited by the Taung species, who renamed themselves Mandalorian and created the culture practiced by later non-Taung Mandalorians. Mandalore is largely sparsely populated wilderness, and its capital city of Keldabe is located on a river that acts as a natural moat. Keldabe is described as an "anarchic fortress" characterized by dissimilar architectural styles.

Literature
Mandalorians debuted in Marvel's Star Wars #68: "The Search Begins", which describes the super-commandos, the official protectors of the planet Mandalore. They are described as being two of three survivors of the Clone Wars, in which they fought for Emperor Palpatine. In Tales of the Jedi, set thousands of years before the original Star Wars film, the Mandalorians are a major military power who side with the Sith in their war against the Jedi, and their leader is manipulated by the Sith into triggering a war with the Republic. They are defeated with the aid of Revan and Malak, and Revan ensures a new Mand'alor, the sole ruler of the Mandalorian people, cannot rise. Their unity as a people dissolved, and instead, the Mandalorians develop into a culture of wandering mercenaries. Through instructions from Revan, as depicted in Knights of the Old Republic and Knights of the Old Republic II: The Sith Lords, Canderous Ordo assumes the title of Mand'alor and reunites the warrior clans. Canderous thus redefined Mandalorians from a species to the idea 'that anybody who follows the Mandalorian warrior way could become a Mandalorian'.

Jango Fett: Open Seasons, set shortly before the Clone Wars, depicts the fighting between two factions: Death Watch, led by Tor Vizsla, and the True Mandalorians, led by Jango Fett's adoptive father Jaster Mereel and later Jango himself. A ruse orchestrated by Vizsla tricks the Jedi into attacking and killing all of the True Mandalorians except Jango, but Jango eventually kills Vizsla and scatters Death Watch.

In the Republic Commando novels, set during the Clone Wars, Mandalore is an independent planet, although many Mandalorian warriors fight for the Separatists. However, a group of Mandalorians had also acted as training sergeants for the clone trooper army under the direction of Jango Fett, and many clone troopers practice Mandalorian customs and traditions. After the establishment of the Galactic Empire, the Mandalorian people are characterized as wary of and reluctant to aid the Empire but unwilling to declare open rebellion because Mandalore lacks the resources to wage war. However, Death Watch reappears and openly supports the Empire. The Empire wishes to mine the planet for its beskar, a blaster-resistant steel, and establishes a garrison in the capital. Mandalore and its people reappear again in the Legacy of the Force novels, set forty years after the original Star Wars film, where Boba Fett is convinced by his granddaughter Mirta Gev to assume the title of Mand'alor and again reunite the Mandalorian people.

Beskar is also described as being lightsaber-proof in the reference book The Jedi Path (2010).

Video games
In the video game Star Wars: Knights of the Old Republic, set roughly 4000 years before the original Star Wars film, the Mandalorian leader (referred to as Mandalore the Ultimate) has been defeated, and no one rules the Mandalorian clans. Mandalorians are also present in the sequels: Knights of the Old Republic II: The Sith Lords, where players can visit a Mandalorian base on a moon called Dxun (where a new leader, Mandalore the Preserver, has ascended to the position), and The Old Republic, an MMORPG set almost four centuries after the previous two games.

Characters 
Many Mandalorians were organised in clans, such as Eldar, Kryze, Rook, Saxon, Vizsla, and Wren. Sometimes organisations were formed that transcended the usual boundaries between the clans, such as the Death Watch during the Clone Wars, which any Mandalorian and even non-Mandalorians could join and lead. The Death Watch, originally founded and led by members of Clan Vizsla, but later taken over by the non-Mandalorian Maul, has been variously characterised as a clan, a crime syndicate, and a warrior faction. Individuals such as Din Djarin (adopted into Mandalorian culture as a foundling by the Children of the Watch, which formed out of the Death Watch) are also shown as members of multi-ethnic organizations, such as the Nevarro-based Bounty Hunters Guild. The Protectors of Concord Dawn were an organisation assigned to protect the royal house of Mandalore. After the Great Purge, Bo-Katan Kryze formed the Nite Owls, a cross-clan group seeking to retrieve the Darksaber and restore Mandalore.

Mandalorian language

The written form of the Mandalorian language, created by Philip Metschan for the display screens of Jango Fett's ship, the Slave I, in Attack of the Clones,  later re-appeared in The Clone Wars and Rebels. Composer Jesse Harlin, needing lyrics for the choral work he wanted for the 2005 Republic Commando video game, invented a spoken form, intending it to represent an ancient language. It was named Mando'a and extensively expanded by Karen Traviss, author of the Republic Commando novel series.

Mando'a is a primarily spoken, agglutinative language that lacks grammatical gender in its nouns and pronouns. The language is also characterized as lacking a passive voice, instead primarily using the active voice. It is also described as having only three grammatical tenses—present, past, and future—but it is said to be often vague and its speakers typically do not use tenses other than the present. The language is described as having a mutually intelligible dialect called Concordian spoken on the planet Concord Dawn, as stated in Traviss' novels Order 66 and 501st, and a dialect spoken on Mandalore's moon Concordia is heard in "The Mandalore Plot", a season-two episode of The Clone Wars.

References

Sources

Further reading

External links

 
 Mandalorian on Wookieepedia, a Star Wars wiki

Fictional mercenaries
Fictional human races
Fictional warrior races
Fictional extraterrestrial life forms
Star Wars species
Fictional military organizations
Star Wars Skywalker Saga characters
Fictional ethnic groups